Tom and Jerry: Snowman's Land is a 2022 American animated Christmas direct-to-video film starring Tom and Jerry. The film is produced by Warner Bros. Animation and Turner Entertainment Co. and animated by Renegade Animation in the United States and Slap Happy Cartoons Inc. in Canada. It was released digitally on November 15, 2022 and was released on DVD on November 29, 2022 by Warner Bros. Home Entertainment (through Studio Distribution Services).

Plot 
Through the use of magic Jerry and his nephew Tuffy, make a snow mouse named Larry who comes to life. In an attempt to keep Larry from melting, Tuffy and Jerry rush him to the fabled Snowman's Village.

Cast 
 Kath Soucie as Tuffy
 Kevin Michael Richardson as Larry
 William Hanna (archival audio recordings) as Tom Cat and Jerry Mouse (uncredited)
 Laraine Newman as Mrs. LePage
 Stephen Stanton as Dr. Doublevay and Lightning
 Rick Zieff as Meathead Cat and Narrator
 Carlos Alazraqui as Floyd
 Kimberly Brooks as Snow Cop and Little Girl
 Joey D'Auria as Butch Cat
 Regi Davis as Snow Mayor

Reception 
Common Sense Media gave the film 3 out of 5 stars. Jennifer Borget, writing for it, gave the film a review, saying "It's refreshing to see that Tom and Jerry: Snowman's Land focuses a little less on the long-time feud and more on saving a new snowman friend. Though the cat and mouse aren't at each other's throats for the entirety of the movie, there's still plenty of silly slapstick violence and humor that those familiar with the franchise will expect. There are also a few catchy songs that keep things moving along, offering a break from the constant crashing and bashing. Though those physical shenanigans can be entertaining for many viewers, some younger kids, particularly those unfamiliar with the franchise and style of comedy, might feel a little unsettled by the animals repeatedly hurting each other. Tom and Jerry take more of a backseat midway through this wintertime story as the focus shifts to Larry, a charismatic snowman, and his relationship with Tuffy. Their friendship is endearing and at times comedic as Larry was "just born" and is naive in many ways. Younger children might relate to Larry since at times he seems childlike. The story is nothing new, but it's cute enough, and it's less violent than some previous Tom and Jerry films." Dillon Gonzales, writing for Geek Vibes Nation, gave the film a review saying "Tom & Jerry: Snowman’s Land is a pretty enjoyable entry from the long-running duo which feels right at home during this time of the year. There is nothing groundbreaking or particularly uproarious for adults, but it provides a base level of warmth and enjoyment to make it a passable viewing experience. As with most films of this sort, the action cannot quite sustain the already-brief runtime, which may lead some audience members to become a bit restless. Nothing will ever capture the old Tom & Jerry spark of the classic cartoons, but these new movies are worth a watch as their own thing. Warner Bros. Home Entertainment has released a DVD with an acceptable A/V presentation and a fun assortment of bonus episodes that provides a nice added value to the package. If you want a lighthearted tale to get you into the holiday spirit, you could do worse."

References

External links 
 

American animated comedy films
2020s English-language films
2020s American animated films
2022 direct-to-video films
2022 animated films
2022 films
Tom and Jerry films
Warner Bros. Animation animated films
Warner Bros. direct-to-video animated films
2022 comedy films
2020s children's animated films
Films directed by Darrell Van Citters